Kelly Tyler Olynyk (born April 19, 1991) is a Canadian professional basketball player for the Utah Jazz of the National Basketball Association (NBA). He played college basketball for the Gonzaga Bulldogs, where he earned NCAA All-American honors in 2013.

After forgoing his senior year of college basketball, Olynyk was selected with the 13th overall pick by the Dallas Mavericks in the 2013 NBA draft, before being immediately traded to the Boston Celtics. In July 2017, he signed with the Miami Heat, with whom he reached the NBA Finals in 2020. In March 2021, Olynyk was traded to the Houston Rockets. He signed with the Pistons in August of the same year.

He also represents the Canadian national team.

Early life
Olynyk was born in Toronto, where he started playing basketball at an early age. He and fellow future NBA player Cory Joseph were both on a Scarborough Blues club team that rarely lost in the late 1990s and early 2000s. One defeat came against rival Toronto 5–0, led by Stephen Curry. Olynyk moved to Kamloops, British Columbia when he was in grade 7.

High school career
Olynyk did not attend a high school or prep school in the United States; he instead stayed home at South Kamloops Secondary School, exposing himself to U.S. competition and coaches while playing on provincial teams – competing at Amateur Athletic Union (AAU) and non-AAU tournaments in the States – and the Canadian junior national team. Olynyk developed as a point guard, continuing to play the position even after growing from 6'3" (1.90 m) to 6'10" (2.08 m) in grade 11. Olynyk was heavily recruited out of high school by the likes of Syracuse, Providence and North Carolina State. He chose Gonzaga in part so he could play closer to home.

Olynyk was named the Basketball BC outstanding high school player of the year in his grade 12 year, leading his South Kamloops Titans to a 36–2 record and a third-place finish at the BC AAA High School Boys' Basketball Championships.

Olynyk was also a quarterback for the Titans when he was in high school and broke his arm during a playoff game in 2007.

College career

Olynyk played college basketball at Gonzaga from 2009 to 2013. He was mostly a bench player for the Bulldogs in his freshman and sophomore years, averaging around 12 to 13 minutes per game. In order to improve his game and get stronger, Gonzaga and Olynyk agreed that he would redshirt his junior year (2011–12), meaning he would practice with the team, but not play.

Olynyk returned to the Bulldogs lineup for the first game of the 2012–13 season, and had a great season, being selected as a Consensus First-Team All-American, as well as to the 2012–13 Academic All-America first team. Following his redshirt junior year, he opted for the NBA draft, thereby forgoing his senior year of eligibility (though by that time he had already received his bachelor's degree in accounting).

Professional career

Boston Celtics (2013–2017)
In a draft-night swap, Olynyk was selected by the Dallas Mavericks with the 13th overall pick in the 2013 NBA draft and then traded to the Boston Celtics for the rights to Lucas Nogueira and two future second round picks. On July 7, 2013, Olynyk signed his rookie scale contract with the Celtics. Olynyk was selected alongside teammate Jared Sullinger on Team Webber for the 2014 Rising Stars Challenge. After averaging 8.7 points and 5.2 rebounds in 70 games in 2013–14, he was named to the NBA All-Rookie second team.

On October 29, 2014, the Celtics exercised their third-year team option on Olynyk's rookie scale contract, extending the contract through the 2015–16 season. On December 15, 2014, he scored a career-high 30 points in a 105–87 win over the Philadelphia 76ers. On January 22, 2015, he injured his ankle after landing on the foot of Thomas Robinson in the fourth quarter of the Celtics' 90–89 win over the Portland Trail Blazers. After being projected to return soon after the All-Star break, Olynyk didn't show signs of being ready to return, and subsequently missed 18 games. He returned to action on March 4 against the Utah Jazz. In game 4 of the first round 2015 NBA playoffs, while grappling, he injured Kevin Love's shoulder against the Cleveland Cavaliers. Love did not play the rest of the 2015 playoffs. 

Olynyk missed the Celtics' 2015–16 season opener against the Philadelphia 76ers on October 28 after being suspended for his role in Kevin Love's left shoulder injury during the 2015 playoffs. Two days later, the Celtics exercised their fourth-year team option on Olynyk's rookie scale contract, extending the contract through the 2016–17 season. On December 11, 2015, he scored a season-high 28 points in a 124–119 double overtime loss to the Golden State Warriors. On March 16, 2016, he returned to action for the Celtics after missing the previous 12 games with an injured right shoulder.

Olynyk missed the first six games of the 2016–17 season after undergoing right shoulder surgery in May 2016, and subsequently spent a day with the Maine Red Claws of the NBA Development League in early November. He made his season debut for the Celtics on November 9, 2016, playing 25 minutes and scoring two points in a 118–93 loss to the Washington Wizards. On January 13, 2017, he set a new season high with 26 points in a 103–101 win over the Atlanta Hawks. In Game 7 of Boston's second-round playoff series against the Washington Wizards on May 15, he scored 14 of his playoff career-high 26 points in the first 8:34 minutes of the fourth quarter, making five consecutive shots, to help the Celtics advance to the Eastern Conference Finals for the first time since 2012 with a 115–105 win and a 4–3 series victory.

On July 4, 2017, after he became a restricted free agent, the Celtics renounced their rights to Olynyk, thus resulting in him becoming an unrestricted free agent.

Miami Heat (2017–2021)
On July 7, 2017, Olynyk signed a four-year, $50 million contract with the Miami Heat. In his debut for the Heat in their season opener on October 18, 2017, Olynyk scored 10 points in a 116–109 loss to the Orlando Magic. On December 20, 2017, he scored a career-high 32 points in a 90–89 win over his former team, the Boston Celtics. On March 19, 2018, he scored 30 points off the bench in a 149–141 double-overtime win over the Denver Nuggets, becoming the second bench player in Heat history to score 30 points. Two days later, he recorded 22 points and a career-high 10 assists in a 119–98 win over the New York Knicks.

On February 10, 2020, Olynyk recorded a double-double, which was 12 points and a new career-high 11 assists, along with six rebounds, one steal and one block in a 113–101 win against the Golden State Warriors. Olynyk helped the Heat reach the 2020 NBA Finals, where they lost to the Los Angeles Lakers in six games.

Houston Rockets (2021)
On March 25, 2021, Olynyk, Avery Bradley, and a 2022 draft pick swap were traded to the Houston Rockets in exchange for Victor Oladipo. Olynyk made his debut in a win over Timberwolves on March 27, recording 16 points, four rebounds, and four assists in 25 minutes. On April 27, he logged a season-high 28 points, alongside nine rebounds, five assists and two steals, in a 107–114 loss to the Minnesota Timberwolves.

Detroit Pistons (2021–2022)
On August 6, 2021, Olynyk signed a 3-year, $37 million contract with the Detroit Pistons. On November 10, in a 112–104 win over the Houston Rockets, he suffered a knee injury. Two days later, the injury was diagnosed as a grade 2 medial collateral ligament (MCL) sprain, ruling Olynyk out of action for at least six weeks.

Utah Jazz (2022–present)
On September 26, 2022, Olynyk was traded, alongside Saben Lee, to the Utah Jazz in exchange for Bojan Bogdanović. On October 23, Olynyk put up 20 points, alongside a game-winning layup, in a 122–121 win over the New Orleans Pelicans.

National team career
On July 17, 2019, Olynyk was included on the Canadian national team's training camp roster, but withdrew from the team after being injured in an exhibition game with Nigeria on August 7.

On May 24, 2022, Olynyk agreed to a three-year commitment to play with the Canadian senior men's national team.

Career statistics

NBA

Regular season

|-
| style="text-align:left;"| 
| style="text-align:left;"| Boston
| 70 || 9 || 20.0 || .466 || .351 || .811 || 5.2 || 1.6 || .5 || .4 || 8.7
|-
| style="text-align:left;"| 
| style="text-align:left;"| Boston
| 64 || 13 || 22.2 || .475 || .349 || .684 || 4.7 || 1.7 || 1.0 || .6 || 10.3
|-
| style="text-align:left;"| 
| style="text-align:left;"| Boston
| 69 || 8 || 20.2 || .455 || .405 || .750 || 4.1 || 1.5 || .8 || .5 || 10.0
|-
| style="text-align:left;"| 
| style="text-align:left;"| Boston
| 75 || 6 || 20.5 || .512 || .354|| .732 || 4.8 || 2.0 || .6 || .4 || 9.0
|-
| style="text-align:left;"| 
| style="text-align:left;"| Miami
| 76 || 22 || 23.4 || .497 || .379 || .770 || 5.7 || 2.7 || .8 || .5 || 11.5
|-
| style="text-align:left;"| 
| style="text-align:left;"| Miami
| 79 || 36 || 22.9 || .463 || .354 || .822 || 4.7 || 1.8 || .7 || .5 || 10.0
|-
| style="text-align:left;"| 
| style="text-align:left;"| Miami
| 67 || 9 || 19.4 || .462 || .406 || .860 || 4.6 || 1.7 || .7 || .3 || 8.2
|-
| style="text-align:left;"|
| style="text-align:left;"|Miami
| 43 || 38 || 26.9 || .431 || .317 || .775 || 6.1 || 2.1 || .9 || .6 || 10.0
|-
| style="text-align:left;"|
| style="text-align:left;"|Houston
| 27 || 24 || 31.1 || .545 || .392 || .835 || 8.4 || 4.1 || 1.4 || .6 || 19.0
|-
| style="text-align:left;"|
| style="text-align:left;"|Detroit
| 40 || 1 || 19.1 || .448 || .336 || .775 || 4.4 || 2.8 || .8 || .5 || 9.1
|- class="sortbottom"
| style="text-align:center;" colspan="2"| Career
| 610 || 166 || 22.0 || .476 || .365 || .782 || 5.1 || 2.0 || .8 || .5 || 10.1

Playoffs

|-
| style="text-align:left;"| 2015
| style="text-align:left;"| Boston
| 4 || 0 || 13.3 || .538 || .500 || .500 || 1.3 || .5 || .5 || .5 || 4.5
|-
| style="text-align:left;"| 2016
| style="text-align:left;"| Boston
| 4 || 0 || 8.0 || .111 || .000 || – || 1.0 || .8 || .3 || .0 || .5
|-
| style="text-align:left;"| 2017
| style="text-align:left;"| Boston
| 18 ||2 || 19.2 || .512 || .319 || .733 || 3.2 || 1.9 || .7 || .8 || 9.2
|-
| style="text-align:left;"| 2018
| style="text-align:left;"| Miami
| 5 || 0 || 29.2 || .477 || .421 || .700 || 4.6 || 3.8 || 1.4 || 1.2 || 12.8
|-
| style="text-align:left;"| 2020
| style="text-align:left;"| Miami
| 17 || 0 || 15.2 || .474 || .347 || .821 || 4.6 || 1.1 || .2 || .5 || 7.6
|- class="sortbottom"
| style="text-align:center;" colspan="2"| Career
| 48 || 2 || 17.4 || .483 || .347 || .750 || 3.5 || 1.6 || .6 || .6 || 7.9

College

|-
| style="text-align:left;"| 2009–10
| style="text-align:left;"| Gonzaga
| 34 || 0 || 12.3 || .500 || .222 || .596 || 2.7 || 0.8 || 0.5 || 0.1 || 3.8
|-
| style="text-align:left;"| 2010–11
| style="text-align:left;"| Gonzaga
| 35 || 4 || 13.5 || .574 || .444 || .618 || 3.8 || 0.7 || 0.3 || 0.1 || 5.8
|-
| style="text-align:left;"| 2011–12
| style="text-align:left;"| Gonzaga
| style="text-align:center;" colspan="11"|  Redshirt
|-
| style="text-align:left;"| 2012–13
| style="text-align:left;"| Gonzaga
| 32 || 27 || 26.4 || .629 || .300 || .776 || 7.3 || 1.7 || 0.7 || 1.1 || 17.8
|- class="sortbottom"
| style="text-align:center;" colspan="2"| Career
| 101 || 31 || 17.2 || .594 || .333 || .709 || 4.6 || 1.1 || 0.5 || 0.5 || 8.9

Personal life
Olynyk's father, Ken, was head men's basketball coach at the University of Toronto from 1989 to 2002 and the Canadian junior men's national team from 1983 to 1996, notably cutting future Canadian basketball icon Steve Nash from the junior national team. His mother, Arlene, was a Canadian Interuniversity Sport (CIS; now U Sports) women's basketball referee. From 1995 to 2004, his mother worked for the Toronto Raptors, as the first female NBA scorekeeper. In 2003, Ken became the athletic director at Thompson Rivers University in Kamloops, British Columbia, with the rest of the family soon joining him in Kamloops. Olynyk has two sisters, Jesse and Maya; the latter played CIS basketball for the Saskatchewan Huskies. Olynyk's family is of Ukrainian origin.

See also

 List of Canadians in the National Basketball Association

References

External links

Kelly Olynyk at Gonzaga Bulldogs
Kelly Olynyk at ESPN.com

1991 births
Living people
2010 FIBA World Championship players
All-American college men's basketball players
Basketball people from British Columbia
Basketball players from Toronto
Boston Celtics players
Canadian expatriate basketball people in the United States
Canadian men's basketball players
Canadian people of Ukrainian descent
Centers (basketball)
Dallas Mavericks draft picks
Detroit Pistons players
Gonzaga Bulldogs men's basketball players
Houston Rockets players
Miami Heat players
National Basketball Association players from Canada
Power forwards (basketball)
Sportspeople from Kamloops
Utah Jazz players